Kaptiau (Kapitiauw) is an Austronesian language spoken on the eastern north coast of Papua province, Indonesia.

See also
Sarmi languages for a comparison with related languages

References

Languages of western New Guinea
Sarmi–Jayapura languages